Gommecourt is a commune in the Pas-de-Calais department in the Hauts-de-France region of France.

Geography

History
Formerly within the ancient County of Artois, the village was redesignated within the new Department of the Pas de Calais after the French Revolution.

World War I

During most of the period of hostilities between 1914 and 1918 (World War I) Gommecourt was in the front line of the Western Front, occupied by the Imperial German Army, and was virtually destroyed as a result of the violence to which it was exposed.

The neighbouring villages of Hebuterne and Foncquevillers 800 yards or so to the west, being conversely in Allied forces occupation, were used as bases for an unsuccessful assault on Gommecourt carried out by the British Army on 1 July 1916, as a part of the Battle of the Somme offensive.

The German troops who defended the village during the battle were the 52nd Infantry Division from Baden together with 2nd Guards Reserve Division from Westphalia; the British troops taking part in the attack comprised the 56th (1/1st London) and the 46th (North Midland) Divisions.The graves of the British casualties are located in a number of local war cemeteries around the site, the graves of German casualties having been relocated further North after the war to the Neuville-St Vaast German war cemetery.

Population

Places of interest
 The church of St Martin, rebuilt, as was most of the village, after World War I.
 The Commonwealth War Graves Commission cemetery.

See also
Communes of the Pas-de-Calais department

References

External links

 The CWGC cemetery

Communes of Pas-de-Calais